Eogastropoda was a previously used taxonomic category of snails or gastropods, a subclass which was erected by Ponder and Lindberg in 1997. It was one of  two great divisions (subclasses) of the class Gastropoda, the snails. The other subclass of gastropods was the Orthogastropoda.

Eogastropoda were the more primitive of the two subclasses, representing a much older line of gastropods. This subclass contained all of the true limpets.

Orders
Orders within the Eogastropoda consisted of:
 Patellogastropoda
 Euomphalina (fossil)
 Neomphalida

External links
 Eogastropoda at palaeos.com
 Eogastropoda at manandmollusc.net

Obsolete gastropod taxa
Mollusc subclasses
Taxa named by Winston Ponder